Washington County Commuter Express is a contracted transportation service that provides service between Milwaukee and Washington counties. WCCE, which is a partner in the Southeast Wisconsin Transit System, is funded by Washington County and operated by Riteway Transportation in Richfield, Wisconsin.

WCCE offers 2 commuter routes operating Monday through Fridays (Downtown Milwaukee Express and Milwaukee Regional Medical Center Express) and a shared-ride taxi program for Washington County residents (with the exception of West Bend and Hartford).

External links
WCCE's website

Bus transportation in Wisconsin